Harichand Guruchand University is a public university, located in Thakurnagar, Gaighata, North 24 Parganas district, West Bengal, India.

History
The university was established in 2018 as Harichand Guruchand University under The Harichand Guruchand University Act, 2018, West Bengal Act XXVII of 2018, Part- III, Acts of the West Bengal Legislature, Law Department Legislative Notification, published in The Kolkata Gazette (Extraordinary), 2nd January, 2019.. It started its educational programme with the appointment of the first vice-chancellor, Tapan Kumar Biswas, in January 2021.

At the initial stage, until the completion of new university buildings, all administrative works and physical teaching programme were operated from P. R. Thakur Government College building, located adjacent to the university. In November 2021, The university started its online teaching programme due to COVID-19 pandemic.

Faculties and Departments
Faculty of arts
 Department of Bengali, 
 Department of Education,
 Department of History

Faculty of Mass communication
 Department of Journalism and Mass Communication

See also
 List of universities in West Bengal
 Education in India
 Education in West Bengal

References

External links
https://wbhed.gov.in/readwrite/uploads/The_Harichand_Guruchand_University_Act_2018.pdf

Universities and colleges in North 24 Parganas district
Universities and colleges in West Bengal
Educational institutions established in 2020
North 24 Parganas district
2020 establishments in West Bengal